Empress Trần may refer to:

Trần Thị Dung (died 1259), Lý Huệ Tông's wife
Most empresses of the Trần dynasty
Thuận Thiên (Nguyễn dynasty empress) (1769–1846), Gia Long's wife

Trần